Claude Bloch (18 March 1923 – 29 December 1971) was a French theoretical nuclear physicist. He authored over 60 published articles and made significant impact on the fields of quantum field theory, nuclear physics, and the many-body problem.

Bloch was born on 18 March 1923 in Paris, France. He was admitted to the École Polytechnique in 1942 and graduated first in his class. He entered the Corps des Mines in 1946. He studied at the Bohr Institute in Copenhagen from 1948-1951 where he worked on the problems in the non-local theory of quantum fields. He worked at the California Institute of Technology in 1952-1953 where he worked on the statistical theory of the nucleus. Upon returning to France in 1953, he joined the Commissariat à l'Energie Atomique (CEA), where he stayed until his death in 1971. While at the CEA, he directed the theoretical physics department at Centre d'Études Nucléaires de Saclay, Gif-sur-Yvette.

See also
Bloch–Messiah decomposition

References

External links
Biography: 

1923 births
1971 deaths
French nuclear physicists
Scientists from Paris
École Polytechnique alumni
Corps des mines
University of Copenhagen alumni